The bonytail chub or bonytail (Gila elegans) is a cyprinid freshwater fish native to the Colorado River basin of Arizona, California, Colorado, Nevada, New Mexico, Utah and Wyoming in the southwestern United States; it has been extirpated from the part of the basin in Mexico. It was once abundant and widespread in the basin, its numbers and range have declined to the point where it has been listed as endangered since 1980 (ESA) and 1986 (IUCN), a fate shared by the other large Colorado basin endemic fish species like the Colorado pikeminnow, humpback chub, and razorback sucker. It is now the rarest of the endemic big-river fishes of the Colorado River. There are 20 species in the genus Gila, seven of which are found in Arizona.

Description

Like many other desert fishes, its coloring tends to be darker above and lighter below, serving as a camouflage. Breeding males have red fin bases. They have a streamlined body and a terminal mouth. Bonytail chubs have bodies that sometimes arch into a smooth, predorsal hump (in adults). While their skull is quite concave, their caudal peduncle (tailside) is thin, and almost looks like a pencil (hence, “bony tail”). The coloration of bonytail chubs is usually dark dorsally and lighter ventrally, however, in very clear waters, they looks almost black all over. During breeding season, males and females have distinct coloration as well. Mature males have bright red-orange lateral bands between their paired fins; while females have a more subdued coloration that is described with the males.

Range and status

The bonytail chub was once found in the Colorado River basin in many U.S. states, including Arizona, California, Colorado, Nevada, New Mexico, Utah and Wyoming. It also occurred in the part of the basin in Mexico, but it has been extirpated from this country. This fish species experienced the most abrupt decline of any of the long-lived fishes native to the main-stems of the Colorado River system. No remaining wild population is self-sustaining and it is functionally extinct. Its survival currently relies on release of hatchery-produced fish; several hatcheries maintain this species. Bonytail chubs were one of the first fish species to reflect the changes that occurred in the Colorado River basin after the construction of Hoover Dam; the fish was extirpated from the lower basin between 1926 and 1950. They may still be found in the Green River of Utah and perhaps in the larger Colorado River water bodies. Gila elegans was added to the US list of endangered species on April 23, 1980 and was first recognized as Endangered in 1986 by IUCN. In 2013, its IUCN status was upgraded to Critically Endangered.

There is contention about the reintroduction of the bonytail chub. Some are concerned about the amount of water used to increase stream flows that are required for adequate bonytail chub habitat.  Bass fishermen are concerned about facilitating the recovery of the bonytail chub by the removal of smallmouth bass, a popular gamefish. Fears of spreading the quagga mussel, an invasive species that clogs water pipelines and fouls marine equipment, has halted the reintroduction of the bonytail chub in Arizona, pending establishment of a stocking protocol that is satisfactory to Arizona wildlife officials.

Habitat

Bonytail chub prefer backwaters with rocky or muddy bottoms and flowing pools, although they have been reported in swiftly moving water. They are mostly restricted to rocky canyons today but were historically abundant in the wide downstream sections of rivers.

Biology

Young bonytail chubs typically eat aquatic plants, while adults feed mostly on small fish, algae, plant debris, and terrestrial insects.

Bonytail chubs are long-lived and may reach an age of up to 50 years.

Reproduction 

Little is known about their reproductive habits, but they are thought to spawn in mid-summer and perhaps hybridize with both roundtail and humpback chubs. Spawning in Lake Mohave has been observed during May, while in the upper Green River, it occurs in the months of June and July. Eggs are laid randomly over the bottom, and no parental care occurs.

Conservation 

The bonytail chub's population sizes are small, and continue to become even smaller. The depletion of the population is primarily due to the habitat alterations caused by dams and due to competition and predation by non-native fish.

A USFWS Recovery Plan was established in 1990, and included objectives of protecting the habitats of the bonytail chub, and even reintroducing hatchery-reared fish into the wild.

The Bonytail Chub Recovery Plan was approved on September 4, 1990, and refugia for the bonytail chub exist today in several places: Dexter National Fish Hatchery, New Mexico; Arizona Game and Fish Page Springs Hatchery; Ouray National Wildlife Refuge, Ouray, Utah; Buenos Aires National Wildlife Refuge, Sasabe, Arizona; Niland Native Fish Ponds, California.

References

External links
 Gila elegans Species Profile, U.S. Fish & Wildlife Service (Accessed 2007 Mar 04)
USFWS Environmental Conservation Online System page for Bonytail chub
 USFWS Upper Colorado Endangered Fish Recovery Program
USFWS List of Fish Listed under Endangered Species Act

Chubs (fish)
Gila (fish)
Taxa named by Spencer Fullerton Baird
Taxa named by Charles Frédéric Girard
Fish described in 1853
Chub
Fish of North America
ESA endangered species
Freshwater fish of North America